Lower Siang (Pron:/ˈsjæŋ or ˈsɪæŋ/) is one of the 25 administrative districts in the state of Arunachal Pradesh, India. The new district was carved out of West Siang and East Siang districts and declared operational on 22 September 2017 and became the 22nd district of Arunachal Pradesh.

History
The creation of Lower Siang district was approved by the Arunachal Pradesh government of Nabam Tuki on 21 March 2013.

The Government of Arunachal Pradesh approved creation of Lower Siang along with three other new districts in January 2013. Its territory was carved out of West Siang and East Siang districts.

The official formation of Lower Siang was delayed over disagreement upon the location of its headquarters. On 22 September 2017 the commencement of operation of Lower Siang district, with Likabali as the temporary headquarters, was approved by the government led by Chief Minister Pema Khandu. On 16 March the Arunachal assembly selected Siji as the headquarters.

Administration
The Lower Siang District is composed of Likabali and Nari-Koyu Assembly Constituencies.

Demographics 
Lower Siang had a population of 22,630. Scheduled Tribes make up 17,865 (78.94%).

Languages
At the time of the 2011 census, 71.98% of the population spoke Galo, 5.14% Nepali, 3.84% Bodo, 3.60% Adi, 3.23% Bengali, 2.55% Assamese, 2.26% Hindi, 2.23% Adi Miniyong and 1.25% Mishing as their first language.

References

 
Districts of Arunachal Pradesh
2013 establishments in Arunachal Pradesh